Cadeby  may refer to:
 Cadeby, Leicestershire, England
 Cadeby, Lincolnshire, England
 Cadeby, South Yorkshire, England